Guillermo Garcia may refer to:
Guillermo García (actor) (born 1981), Venezuelan actor
Guillermo García (swimmer) (born 1955), Mexican Olympic swimmer
Guillermo García Oropeza (born 1937), Mexican writer
Guillermo García-López (born 1983), Spanish professional tennis player
Guillermo Garcia (baseball) (born 1972), former Major League Baseball catcher
Guillermo García (sailor) (born 1944), Mexican Olympic sailor
Guillermo Garcia (volleyball) (born 1983), Argentina national volleyballer
Guillermo Garcia (tennis), Chilean tennis player at the 1955 & 1956 US Open
Guillermo García Cantú (born 1960), Mexican actor
Guillermo Garcia Gonzales (1953–1990), Cuban chess grandmaster
Guillermo García (Salvadoran footballer) (born 1969), Salvadoran football player
Guillermo García, model from Zaragoza; Mister Spain 2009
Guillermo García (musician) (born 1988), Mexican guitarist for S7N